S.O.S. Salvem O Surf (Save the Surf) is an environmental non-governmental organisation in Portugal, with a strong technical profile, that aims to solve problems and issues related with Surfing but also to develop the sport. It strives to solve problems constructively, guided by the need to raise awareness of the value of surf, and the will to create added value to all the involved parties.

S.O.S. Salvem O Surf as a spontaneous popular movement was born with SOS Santo Amaro at the end of 2002 with the objective to protect the wave of Santo Amaro de Oeiras, the only surfing alternative in the Lisbon region in days of strong stormy SW winds. The movement achieved an agreement with the Oeiras Town Hall that allowed the preservation of 70% of the wave extension area.

Guiding principles
S.O.S. Salvem O Surf actions are guided by well defined principles of Protection and Development of surfing

Protection
Protecting and preserving beaches and waves for surfing.
Creating National and World Surfing Reserves.
Inclusion of surf in Environmental Impact Studies.
Environmental monitoring and care of water quality.
Correcting coastal work projects whenever there is a real threat to surfing.
Preservation of surfing in projects related with the energy of waves.
Safeguarding the public access to waves (preventing the privatisation of accesses and coast).

Development
Creation of artificial reefs that can be used for surfing.
Promotion and support of studies that sustainably promote the development of surfing.
Monitoring and characterisation of beaches and waves for surfing.
General social-economic studies aiming at better understanding the potential of surfing.
Saving lives of both surfers and swimmers, endangered by rip currents or coastal works.

Team
At the core of S.O.S. there is a team, with diverse capabilities in sports, scientific and business skills, based in the best waves and schools. Namely, S.O.S. is unique and different from other surf/ocean NGO and associations as its technical team is at the forefront of studies in coastal engineering and environment, artificial reef projects, surf-economics, social politics and is, thus, able to solve problems of wave preservation from the onset, directly proposing surfing friendly solutions to local and national government, population and coastal work promoters.

S. O. S. started as a civic and informal surfer movement in 2002–2003 to preserve beaches and waves for surfing from coastal works who ignored surfing. The civic movement was initially coordinated by Pedro Bicudo (PhD, Physicist), Paula Marques Figueiredo (PhD, Geologist) and by Pedro Monteiro (Civil and Coastal Engineer). In 2008/2009 the same team, including also Guilherme Garcia, upgraded S. O. S. to a legal surfer's Association in order to improve the protecting and developing of surfing.

Since 2010 a new board is directing and further upgrading S. O. S.
Pedro Bicudo is S.O.S.’s President, and coordinates its technical team on Coastal Engineering and Surf Reserves. He holds a PhD in Theoretical Physics from Instituto Superior Técnico, where he is "Professor Auxiliar Agregado" in the Physics Department. His second field of research is Coastal Science and Engineering, and he coordinated the Study for an artificial reef for surfing at São Pedro do Estoril, the first surf reef project in mainland Europe.
Pedro Monteiro is S.O.S's vice-president, and coordinates the Events and Sporting team of S. O. S. He holds a Civil Engineering degree, with a post-graduate internship in Coastal Engineering at Laboratório Nacional de Engenharia Civil, and he is the wave quality expert of the Coastal Engineering team of S. O. S. When graduating, he became a University League Champion, and he excels in tube riding. He is a respected surf school and surf club manager, and surf coach.
Ana Horta coordinates the Environment Team of S. O. S. the team to upgrade S.O.S. as an Environmental Non Governmental Organisation (ENGO). She holds a PhD in Environment Engineering by the Instituto Superior Técnico. Ana Horta is an expert in Gostatistics, and in Environmental Assessment studies.
Rita Marteleira is the hands-on of S.O.S. and part of the Environment Team. She is completing her MsC in Environmental Engineering at Universidade Nova de Lisboa.
Manuel Valadas Preto is the responsible for funding and relationship with business in S. O. S. He consults for multinationals and start-ups, and holds an MBA from London Business School.
Guilherme Garcia is the Public Relations, and also the website caretaker of S. O. S. Besides working as a surfing instructor, Guilherme writes novels and in surf blogs.
João de Macedo, besides challenging the biggest waves of the planet, is an Economist and World Surfing Reserves Ambassador from the  “Save the Waves” in San Francisco that he shares with Sintra as home town. He has a MsC in Sports Management.
Pedro Adão e Silva holds a PhD in Social and Political Sciences and is a professor of Public Policies. He is a leading public figure, a TV and radio commentator and a columnist in Expresso and in the surf media.
Ruth Ferrony Grilo is responsible for the image and design of S.O.S. She provides artistic and civic formation for several NGO and the National Parliamento of East-Timor where she resides.

History

In the 2000 decade, partly boosted by the European Union Structural Funds and Cohesion Funds, the number of coastal engineering works increased dramatically in the Portuguese coast, to develop harbours or to protect the coast. However, in general, the Environmental Impact Accessment of these coastal constructions ignored to study the respective impacts on surfing. S.O.S. started as a civic and informal surfer movement in 2002/2003 to preserve beaches and waves for surfing from these coastal works who ignored surfing. In 2008/2009,  S.O.S. turned legal, as a non-profit surfer's Association in order to improve the protecting and developing of surfing. S.O.S. is further being upgraded to an Environmental Non-Governmental Organization, since the surf and beach damaging coastal works continue being constructed. S. O. S. has been organizing campaigns to protect the coast since 2002.

2002
Santo Amaro S.O.S. came to life from a group of surfers to defend the only wave near Lisbon that works with SW storms and, for the first time in Portugal, technical reasoning was used to convince the Harbour of Lisbon and the local Municipality of Oeiras that the peer would damage the wave and would not have the desired protective effect. These entities have changed the project and build a peer with only half of the length preserving 70% of the wave extension.

2003
Carcavelos –  in February, S.O.S. campaigned to converge more than 5.000 surfers to this beach break to ask the Municipality of Cascais not to build groins to contain the sands (again, technical proof was given that this was not an efficient solution). With a 100% success, the wave was fully preserved. Moreover, S.O.S. was awarded a medal by the Municipality for its actions in “protection of nature and the environment”.

2003 and 2006
Costa da Caparica – in June 2003, local surf clubs have asked S.O.S. to help them making a case for the beach sand nourishment to protect the coast line. Despite giving technical evidence the Municipality has not heard the surfers and in 2006 the dunes were damaged by storms and high tides, leading to an expensive and urgent beach nourishment and sea wall increase. Costa da Caparica Erosion continues in Costa da Caparica and S.O.S. considers that the present groin and sea wall defence of is not sustainable.

2003 and 2008
Jardim do Mar- S.O.S. supported technically in 2003 the civic movement for the preservation of Jardim do Mar, led by the environmental associations Save the Waves Coalition, Quercus and Cosmo. S.O.S. and has been repeatedly advocating the construction of Multi-purpose Reefs, however composed of rock since rock is the local natural substrate, to recover the damaged waves of Jardim do Mar, Lugar de Baixo and Ponta Delgada in the island of Madeira. However the Regional Government of Madeira has not yet chosen to recover the damaged waves.

2006
S.Pedro do Estoril – As a result of the preserving of Carcavelos Beach, the Cascais Municipality has requested a study for an artificial reef to improve surf conditions in S.Pedro do Estoril. The members of the Technical team of SOS also motivated some of the best Science and Engineering Institutions of Portugal, Instituto Superior Técnico, Faculdade de Ciências da Universidade de Lisboa and Laboratório Nacional de Engenharia Civil, to join the Cascais Municipality in the artificial surfing reef study.

2008
Carcavelos – In July 2008, together with the event organizer Ceativa, S.O.S. created a Giant Logo, composed by surfers, their surfboards and bodyboards, with giant human capital letters SOS. The logo included 96 surfers and bodyboarders. In 2009 the Giant Logo was repeated at Carcavelos and at Figueira da Foz. The S.O.S. Giant Logo is a remarkable symbol of  S. O. S. with a large symbolic impact in the media and in the public.

2009
Cabedelo, Figueira da Foz – S.O.S. was called to give technical support to a locals surfer movement that wanted to impede the extension of a peer north of the Mondego River threatening this world class wave. S.O.S. has also given support to create a massive Giant Logo, composed of 200 surfers, in the water.

Casualties
In addition, S.O.S. members have been, or are still, involved in many other threatened waves, with mixed results::

Rabo de Peixe, Azores: Disappeared
 Kirra, Sines: Disappeared
 Cabedelo, Porto: Disappeared
 São Torpes, Sines: Endangered
 Santa Catarina, Azores: Endangered
 Caxias, Oeiras/Lisboa: Endangered

Lost waves
Portugal loses, on average, one world quality wave per year.

References

External links
Official website of S.O.S. Salvem O Surf (Save The Surf)
Interview to Pedro Pecas (Portuguese)
Theoretical study for the artificial reef in S.Pedro do Estoril (Portuguese)
Estudo da Hidrodinâmica em torno do Recife Artificial para a prática do Surf a construir em São Pedro do Estoril, Cascais, Aplicação dos Modelos de Boussinesq: COULWAVE e FUNWAVE (Portuguese)

Environmental organisations based in Portugal
Surfing organizations
Articles containing video clips